Mohammad Asif (born 12 March 1919 – 1998) was an Afghan field hockey player, who competed at the 1936 Summer Olympic Games and played in both of his team's games. He was a member of Afghanistan's royal Durrani dynasty and held the title of shazada.

After the games Asif served as a magistrate in Punjab.

References

External links
 

Afghan male field hockey players
Olympic field hockey players of Afghanistan
Field hockey players at the 1936 Summer Olympics
1919 births
1998 deaths